[Islamabad]] has many environmental issues, severely affecting its biophysical environment as well as human health. The industrialization as well as lax environmental oversight have contributed to the problems. The various forms of pollution have increased as Karachi which has caused widespread environmental and health problems. Air pollution, lack of proper waste management infrastructure and degradation of water bodies are the major environmental issues in Karachi.

Biota

Climate

Geography

Water

Climate change

Pollution
Pollution is the introduction of contaminants into the natural environment that cause adverse change. Pollution can take the form of chemical substances or energy, such as noise, heat or light. Pollutants, the components of pollution, can be either foreign substances/energies or naturally occurring contaminants. Pollution is often classed as point source or nonpoint source pollution. According to a study by National Institutes of Health, chromium and lead levels are high in almost all ground water sources, however extremely high concentrations were found in industrial areas. Presence of any one of the heavy metal contamination necessitate the need for the estimation of other heavy metals as significant positive correlation was found between chromium and lead concentration, indicating the possibility of similar contamination sources in Karachi.

Coast Pollution
The Karachi coastline, which stretches over 135 km, is facing severe pollution due  to a combination of industrial, port, municipal, and transportation activities in the area.  The coastline is being overwhelmed with water-borne pollution being discharged in the  shipping process into the marine environment. A recent study found that some of the  marine life was contaminated with lead, which if consumed by humans through seafood, has been linked to anemia, kidney failure and brain damage. In fact, the study also discovered that even the mangrove forests protecting the feeder creeks from sea erosion  as well as a source of sustenance for fishermen are threatened by this pollution. In the Korangi Industrial Area, 2,500 industrial units including 170 tanneries dispose untreated waste into the Arabian Sea.

Air pollution
Air pollution is the release of chemicals and particulates into the atmosphere. Common gaseous pollutants include carbon monoxide, sulfur dioxide, chlorofluorocarbons (CFCs) and nitrogen oxides produced by industry and motor vehicles. Photochemical ozone and smog are created as nitrogen oxides and hydrocarbons react to sunlight. Particulate matter, or fine dust is characterized by their micrometre size PM10 to PM2.5. The air in Karachi is polluted by automobile smoke, especially rickshaws and buses, industrial emissions, open burning of garbage, house fires, and other particles but the government and environment organizations do not seem to take the issue seriously or in a timely manner.

Rickshaws
The two-stroke engine on rickshaws and motorcycles are one of the major polluters of air in Karachi and rest of Pakistan. The two-stroke engines, as well as defective or poorly maintained vehicles, are major polluters by producing carbon dioxide emissions. Two-stroke engines as well as defective vehicles using substandard lubricant are major emitters of sulfur dioxide and smoke. Automobiles operating on compressed natural gas and liquefied petroleum gas are major air polluters.

Light pollution
The Light pollution includes light trespass, over-illumination and astronomical interference.
Light pollution is the presence of anthropocentric and artificial light in the night environment. It is exacerbated by excessive, misdirected or obtrusive use of light, but even carefully used light fundamentally alters natural conditions

Littering

Littering is the criminal throwing of inappropriate man-made objects, unremoved, onto public and private properties. The Karachi Metropolitan Corporation have suffered due to mismanaged administrative and financial affairs and are now facing serious difficulties in discharging basic duties such as collection and disposal of municipal garbage from important residential areas.

Noise pollution
Noise pollution which encompasses roadway noise, aircraft noise, industrial noise as well as high-intensity sonar. The noise for Karachi came to 80 dB (A), the General Noise Index x (G.N.I.) to 460, and the noise pollution level (N.P.L.) to 99 dB (A). These values are significantly higher (P less than 0.01) than the available international data. The sources of noise production were identified as, the road traffic, human activity, industrial and civil works, mechanical and engineering workshops. The most noticeable sources of noise pollution in Karachi, are the autorickshaws, trail motor bikes and the fag horns of public transport. The noise emanating from a wide variety of sources such as; Motorcycles, Auto-Rikshaws, Cars, Wagons, Mini-buses & Buses, Trucks, Tractors, Water tankers, Bulldozers and Machine drills etc.

Soil contamination
Soil contamination occurs when chemicals are released by spill or underground leakage. Among the most significant soil contaminants are hydrocarbons, heavy metals, MTBE, herbicides, pesticides and chlorinated hydrocarbons.

Naya Nazimabad Contamination
The Naya Nazimabad  a neighbourhood of Karachi was developed on contaminated soil resulting in serious health issues for the residents. There has been a coverup to downplay the contamination of Naya Nazimabad in Pakistan's media. Shunaid Qureshi, developer of Naya Nazimabad, CEO Al Abbas Sugar Mills and former Chairman of Pakistan Sugar Mills Association (PASMA) were arrested in January 2014. The Javedan Cement Limited (JCL) was privatized and sold at very low prices of Rs. 4.3 billion ($43 million) to Haji Ghani and Shunaid Qureshi. The new owners almost immediately stopped production, dismantled the cement factory and converted the 1,300 acres JCL land into Naya Nazimabad housing project worth over Rs. 100 billion ($1 billion).

Radioactive contamination
Radioactive contamination resulting from 20th century activities in atomic physics, such as nuclear power generation and nuclear weapons research, manufacture and deployment. (See alpha emitters and actinides in the environment). The Karachi Nuclear Power Complex is located 50 km from Karachi downtown. The KANUPP-1 is a 137 MW CANDU reactor. There are two 1100 MW each CAP1400 Nuclear reactors under construction. In November 2013, Pakistan and China confirmed that CAP1400 Nuclear reactor, based on AP1000 Westinghouse Electric Company Pressurized water reactor, will be built at Karachi. Questions are also raised about the design model of the proposed Karachi power plants. It has been claimed that the design of the Karachi plants, the ACP-I000, is still under development and thus untried and untested.

Thermal pollution
Thermal pollution is a temperature change in natural water bodies caused by human influence, such as use of water as coolant in a power plant.

Visual pollution
Visual pollution, which can refer to the presence of overhead power lines, motorway billboards, scarred landforms (as from strip mining), open storage of trash, municipal solid waste or space debris. The Karachi Metropolitan Corporation (KMC) has imposed a ban on installing new advertising billboards, signboards and other hoardings in the metropolitan for the next three months. The decision was taken in a meeting of KMC’s senior officials after the corporation took notice of visual pollution blighting the landscape of the city. There are over 3,000 billboards in Karachi causing visual pollution.

Water pollution
Water pollution id by the discharge of wastewater from commercial and industrial waste (intentionally or through spills) into surface waters; discharges of untreated domestic sewage, and chemical contaminants, such as chlorine, from treated sewage; release of waste and contaminants into surface runoff flowing to surface waters (including urban runoff and agricultural runoff, which may contain chemical fertilizers and pesticides); waste disposal and leaching into groundwater; eutrophication and littering.

110 million gallons per day of raw, untreated water from the Indus River is mixed with treated water from the Karachi Water and Sewerage Board (KWSB)’s water treatment plants, and this mixed water is supplied to the city. The KWSB claims that this water is fit for consumption. The quantity of chlorine has also been increased to ensure that all sorts of bacteria and germs are eliminated.
 	
Karachi has drinking water pollution and inaccessibility. There is dissatisfaction with garbage disposal in Karachi. Instead of disposing garbage at the solid waste management plant, the people have been throwing and burning it at various residential and commercial points in the city, causing immense pollution.

Tanning
Pakistan exports leather product using Leather production processes including tanning. In addition to the other environmental impacts of leather, the production processes have a high environmental impact, most notably due to:
 the heavy use of polluting chemicals in the tanning process
 air pollution due to the transformation process (hydrogen sulfide during dehairing and ammonia during deliming, solvent vapours).

One tonne of hide or skin generally leads to the production of 20 to 80 m3 of turbid and foul-smelling wastewater, including chromium levels of 100–400 mg/L, sulfide levels of
200–800 mg/L and high levels of fat and other solid wastes, as well as notable pathogen contamination. Pesticides are also often added for hide conservation during transport.
With solid wastes representing up to 70% of the wet weight of the original hides, the tanning process comes at a considerable strain on water treatment installations.

Industrial
Karachi’s industries generate a cocktail of chemicals and toxic substances, and a significant amount of industrial effluent is discharged into creeks, rivers, or the sea.

Textile
Pakistan exports textile products and the Textile mill effluents is causing huge pollution of its water. Textile mill effluents (TMEs) are wastewater discharges from textile mills that are involved in wet processes such as scouring, neutralizing, desizing, mercerizing, carbonizing, fulling, bleaching, dyeing, printing and other wet finishing activities. They are not generated at facilities that conduct only dry processing (carding, spinning, weaving and knitting), laundering or manufacturing of synthetic fibres through chemical processes.

Environmental Management
Environmental management comprises two terms: environment and management. So at first, we have to know, what management is. Then we can easily understand about the environmental management.

Management is the process of planning, designing, controlling, coordinating, staffing or leading to acquire a desired objective.

At first, one views about management functionally, such as measuring quantity, adjusting plans, meeting goals. This applies even in situation where planning does not take place. From this perspective, Henri Fayol considers management to consist of six functions:
Whatever, everyday we are managing everything, every idea. It leads the proper to reach the desired goal.

Environmental management system is a systematic approach of planning, designing, coordinating, leading and controlling all the activities and what objectives/ functions of any entity to have a desired outcome in terms of enhancing environmental quality.
Objectives of Environmental Management

From a practical point of view,
 We want a healthy living environment. To ensure it we have to remove all kinds of pollution or environmental media. In situ management: where we find problem, we manage here.
 Separate the source and receptor and keep a buffer zone between them as it works like sink. This zone can be physical or by distances. Its goal is to create buffer zone.
 Forecasting
 Planning
 Organizing
 Commanding
 Coordinating
 Controlling

Environmental issues

See also
 Environmental issues in Pakistan
 Environmental issues in Siachen
 Geography of Pakistan
 Health care in Pakistan
 List of environmental issues
 Protected areas of Pakistan
 Wildlife of Pakistan

References

External links
 Nontraditional Security Threats in Pakistan by Ali Tauqeer Sheikh (October 2011)
 Ecological and Nontraditional Security Challenges in South Asia by Dennis Pirages, Farooq Sobhan, Stacy D. VanDeveer and Li Li (June 2011)
 Pollution in Pakistan and its solutions
 AIR POLLUTION IN KARACHI ITS CAUSES AND EFFECTS ON HUMAN HEALTH 
  Rising air pollution badly affecting Karachiites
 Karachi among 8 most polluted cities in Asia
 Effect of air pollution on daily morbidity in Karachi, Pakistan
 Air Quality in the Atmosphere of Karachi City — An Overview
 The Karachi Coastline Case
 Save Karachi - Save Earth

 
Environment of Sindh
Karachi